Computer network programming involves writing computer programs that enable processes to communicate with each other across a computer network.

Connection-oriented and connectionless communications 

Very generally, most of communications can be divided into connection-oriented, and connectionless.

Clients and servers 

For connection-oriented communications, communication parties usually have different roles. One party is usually waiting for incoming connections; this party is usually referred to as "server". Another party is the one which initiates connection; this party is usually referred to as "client".

For connectionless communications, one party ("server") is usually waiting for an incoming packet, and another party ("client") is usually understood as the one which sends an unsolicited packet to "server".

Popular protocols and APIs 

Network programming traditionally covers different layers of OSI/ISO model (most of application-level programming belongs to L4 and up). The table below contains some examples of popular protocols belonging to different OSI/ISO layers, and popular APIs for them.

See also 

 Software-defined networking
Infrastructure as code
 Site reliability engineering
 DevOps

References 
 W. Richard Stevens: UNIX Network Programming, Volume 1, Second Edition: Networking APIs: Sockets and XTI, Prentice Hall, 1998, 

Computer programming
Inter-process communication
Computer networks